Andrzej Mieczysław Diakonow (born 14 January 1950 in Klembów) is a Polish politician, member of the Law and Justice party. He was elected to Sejm on 25 September 2005.

References

1950 births
Living people
People from Wołomin County
Law and Justice politicians